Diospyros decandra, is a tropical tree in the ebony and persimmon family. Its flowers are white.

It is a popular tree in Vietnam where it is grown in urban areas and close to temples. It is called "cây thị" in Vietnamese and it has appeared in Vietnamese folklore, such as The Story of Tam and Cam.  It is also the provincial tree of Chanthaburi Province, Thailand; its Thai name is ลูกจัน "luuk-jan".  It is a small plant (about 5–6 m tall).  Its leaves are 6–8 cm long and 3–4 cm wide with a pointed tip.

Fruits
Its fruits are yellow-colored and are known as "Gold Apple" or "trái thị". They're about 3–6 cm in diameter and have a strong fragrant smell.  The fruits are edible and are known to taste good if prepared correctly.  They are believed to have medicinal value.

References 

decandra
Trees of Vietnam
Trees of Thailand